Chiloxanthus stellatus is a species of shore bug in the family Saldidae. It is found in Europe and Northern Asia (excluding China) and North America.

Subspecies
These two subspecies belong to the species Chiloxanthus stellatus:
 Chiloxanthus stellatus stellatus (Curtis, 1835)
 Chiloxanthus stellatus suturalis (Jakovlev, 1889)

References

Articles created by Qbugbot
Insects described in 1835
Chiloxanthinae